Kodaline are an Irish rock band. Originally known as 21 Demands, the band adopted their current name in 2012 to coincide with the changing of their music. The group comprises Steve Garrigan, Mark Prendergast, Vincent May and Jason Boland.

Garrigan and Prendergast grew up in Swords, Dublin, and have known each other since childhood. May and Garrigan attended Colaiste Choilm CBS, Swords, where they participated in battles of the bands. Boland joined the group in 2012. They have released four albums: In a Perfect World (2013), Coming Up for Air (2015), and Politics of Living (2018). Their fourth studio album, One Day at a Time, was released on 12 June 2020.

Career

2005–2011: 21 Demands
As 21 Demands, the band first came to attention in November 2006, when they participated in the fifth series of RTÉ talent show You're a Star; finishing as the series' runners-up. On 3 March 2007, 21 Demands released their own single called "Give Me a Minute" through Pieta House downloads on the RTÉ website. They made history when their single topped the Irish Singles Chart, becoming the first independently released track to achieve this milestone.
21 Demands also wrote the single "One of Those Days" which they played on the Irish SuperValu channel BalconyTV.

2012–2014: In a Perfect World
The quartet released their debut extended play—The Kodaline EP—on Friday 7 September 2012, produced by Stephen Harris. "All I Want" was selected as BBC Radio 1 DJ Fearne Cotton's Record of the Week, featured in the season 9 episode of Grey's Anatomy, "Remember the Time", and was used in the background music for Google's 2012: Year in Review video. On 9 December 2012, the BBC announced that Kodaline had been nominated for the Sound of 2013 poll. On 17 June 2013, Kodaline released their first studio album, In a Perfect World. In a Perfect World includes the singles "High Hopes", "All I Want", "Love Like This", and "Pray", as well as seven new songs. The iTunes deluxe edition of the album contains "The Answer", "Perfect World", "Lose Your Mind", and "Latch", with music videos for "All I Want" and "High Hopes". The CD deluxe edition, instead, contains a CD of live performances of "All I Want", "High Hopes", "Love Like This", "Pray", "All Comes Down", and "The Answer" at The Button Factory in Dublin. Their song "All I Want" was featured on the MTV show Catfish: The TV Show. "All I Want" was also in Season 5, episode 10 of The Vampire Diaries. The songs "Perfect World" and "Brand New Day" from this album, are currently used in the soundtrack for the hit Channel 4 show Gogglebox, the former is the show's main theme tune. In April 2014, Kodaline released a cover version of Paul McCartney's 1980 single "Coming Up" in celebration of Record Store Day. In April 2014, the song "All I Want" was released as part of the soundtrack for The Fault in Our Stars, as well as used in the film. In July 2014, the songs "Pray" and "High Hopes" were featured in trailers for the films Horns and Love, Rosie, respectively. The song "All I Want" was used in TCM Remembers, Turner Classic Movies' annual remembrance of film industry contributors who died in 2014.

2014–2017: Coming Up for Air
In December 2014, the band announced their second LP Coming Up for Air, and released a song called "Honest" on YouTube. A few days later they also published the song "Unclear". Following its release on 9 February 2015, the album entered the UK Albums Chart at number 4. "The One" and "Honest" both reached Top 40 in the UK Singles Chart. Lead singer Steve Garrigan appeared on episode 18 of The Midnight Hour.

2017–2019: Politics of Living
The lead single "Brother" was released on 23 June 2017. Garrigan once again appeared on The Midnight Hour alongside Eldeniro90 where he premiered new music. The group also released a single, 'Follow Your Fire', on 23 March 2018 which was a massive hit in Romania reaching number 7 on the charts. "Shed a Tear" was released as the third single from the album on 15 June 2018. "Worth It" was released as the fourth single from the album on 20 July 2018. "Head Held High" was released as the fifth single from the album on 24 August 2018. The song peaked at number sixty-eight on the Irish Singles Chart. The album titled Politics of Living was released on 28 September 2018.

2020–present: One Day at a Time
On 10 January 2020, the band released "Wherever You Are" as the lead single from their fourth studio album. The song peaked at number sixty-six on the Irish Singles Chart. "Sometimes" was released as the bands second single from their fourth studio album on 6 March 2020. The song peaked at number ninety-four on the Irish Singles Chart. The album titled One Day at a Time was released on 12 June 2020. The album peaked at number two on the Irish Albums Chart. In November 2020, the band released the single "This Must Be Christmas".

Kodaline released their first live album, Our Roots Run Deep, on 14 October 2022. It was recorded at the Olympia Theatre, Dublin.

Discography

Studio albums
 In a Perfect World (2013)
 Coming Up for Air (2015)
 Politics of Living  (2018)
 One Day at a Time (2020)

Live albums
 Our Roots Run Deep (2022)

Band members

Current members
 Steve Garrigan – lead vocals, rhythm guitars, keyboards, harmonica, mandolin (born 23 August 1988) (2005-present)
 Mark Prendergast – lead guitars, keyboards, vocals (born 16 January 1989) (2005-present)
 Vincent May – drums, percussion, vocals (born 11 February 1990) (2005-present)
 Jason Boland – bass guitar, vocals (born 31 August 1987) (2012-present)

Previous members
 Conor Linnane – bass guitar, backing vocals, keyboards (2005-2011)

Awards and nominations

Film soundtracks 
Kodaline have been featured in different movies and shows. Below is a list of some of the films that their music has been played in:

See also
 List of artists who reached number one in Ireland

External Links

References

People from Swords, Dublin
Irish pop punk groups
Musical groups from Dublin (city)
Musical groups established in 2005
You're a Star contestants